Coldstream is a closed railway station, located in Station Street, Coldstream, Victoria, Australia, on the now-closed Healesville greater-metropolitan line.

The station buildings were destroyed by fire in the late 1990s. The track from Coldstream to Yarra Glen was formerly leased by the Yarra Valley Tourist Railway, who discontinued their lease due to the poor condition of bridges along the line. An old platform in poor condition remains at the former station.

Until 1992, freight trains ran to Coldstream to service the fertilizer factory adjacent to the former station.

In 2019, The Daylesford Spa Country Railway removed the turnouts from Coldstream for use at Bullarto by the railway.

As of January 2020, Coldstream station has become part of the Yarra valley rail trail and the platform has been restored

External links
 Melway map at street-directory.com.au

Disused railway stations in Melbourne
Railway stations in Australia opened in 1888
Railway stations closed in 1993
Railway stations in the Shire of Yarra Ranges